John Bromwich and Adrian Quist were the defending champions, but did not compete.

Ken McGregor and Frank Sedgman defeated Jaroslav Drobný and Eric Sturgess in the final, 3–6, 6–2, 6–3, 3–6, 6–3 to win the gentlemen's doubles tennis title at the 1951 Wimbledon Championship.

Seeds

  Ken McGregor /  Frank Sedgman (champions)
  Gardnar Mulloy /  Dick Savitt (semifinals)
  Herbie Flam /  Art Larsen (first round)
  Jaroslav Drobný /  Eric Sturgess (final)

Draw

Finals

Top half

Section 1

Section 2

Bottom half

Section 3

Section 4

References

External links

Men's Doubles
Wimbledon Championship by year – Men's doubles